The eighth season of I'm a Celebrity...Get Me Out of Here was commissioned by Network 10 in February 2021. It launched on 3 January 2022 and is hosted by Julia Morris and Chris Brown. It is the second series to be pre-recorded in Australia, as a result of the COVID-19 pandemic. It was filmed in Dungay, Australia, where the original British series previously filmed, instead of its usual production location in South Africa. Filming occurred over three weeks in September 2021, with a live grand-finale airing on 30 January 2022.

Teaser
The first teaser trailer, featuring hosts Chris Brown and Julia Morris in a burlesque-style parody of Monty Python's "Always Look on the Bright Side of Life", was released on 20 November 2021.

Celebrities
On 2 January, the first two contestants were revealed by Network 10, prior to the premiere of the first episode, to be celebrity chef and television presenter Poh Ling Yeow and former AFL coach Nathan Buckley. On 3 January, former NRL player and television presenter Beau Ryan was the third celebrity also announced as a contestant prior to the show's premiere. In episode 2, international reality television star Joey Essex entered the camp as an intruder. Essex was previously a contestant on the thirteenth series of the British version of the show in 2013.

In an I'm a Celebrity world first, this season included a "fake celebrity" among the cast - David Subritzky assumed the identity of an influencer and shoe designer with 3.9 million Instagram followers. As part of a secret mission, Poh had to convince her campmates that he was in fact a celebrity.

Results and elimination
 Indicates that the celebrity received the most votes from the public
 Indicates that the celebrity was immune from the elimination challenge
 Indicates that the celebrity was named as being in the bottom 2 or 3.
 Indicates that the celebrity came last in a challenge or received the fewest votes and was evicted immediately (no bottom three)
 Indicates that the celebrity withdrew from the competition

Note

Tucker trials
The contestants take part in daily trials to earn food. These trials aim to test both physical and mental abilities. Success is usually determined by the number of stars collected during the trial, with each star representing a meal earned by the winning contestant for their camp mates.

 The contestants decided who did which trial
 The trial was compulsory and the celebrities did not decide who took part
 The contestants were chosen by the evicted celebrities
 The voting for the trial was of dual origin

Notes
In this trial, while only six celebrities participated, all campmates were able to watch. However, as the campmates stole food from the trial, the 8 and a 1/2 stars they had won were forfeited and no food was received by the celebrities for dinner.
Tottie, as an intruder, had to participate with Davina in The Mile High Club trial as part of her entry into the camp.
Brooke did not participate in this trial because she was medically exempt.
The celebrities competed against each other in two teams, a red team and a blue team, during Battles Week.
Julia correctly answered the last question for the celebrities, earning them an extra ½ star, however the celebrities were still dunked with slime and offal as though they had answered incorrectly.
As Brooke was medically exempt from participating in the trial, co-host Dr Chris Brown offered to step-in for her in the trial and won the camp two stars. As a result, Brooke replaced Dr Chris Brown's hosting position and co-hosted alongside Julia Morris.

Star count

Secret missions

Poh's secret mission: mystery celebrity twist
On the first day, it was revealed to Poh that a fake contestant, who was not actually a celebrity, would enter the camp. Poh had to convince her campmates that the fake contestant, David Subritzky, was in fact a real celebrity. The fake contestant assumed the identity of an influencer and shoe designer with 3.9 million Instagram followers. For each day that her campmates remained unsuspicious, Poh would win the camp a larger reward. The twist was similar to that of the fourth series of Celebrity Big Brother UK which saw non-celebrity Chantelle Houghton undertake the same task.

During the five days that Poh had to keep the fake contestant a secret, she received help from the camp's intruders, Joey Essex and Davina Rankin, who pretended to have known David. Poh succeeded in her challenge and on the last day on which the fake celebrity had to remain undercover, the campmates voted on whether David should be allowed to stay in camp to become a "real celebrity".

Nathan and Poh's secret mission: Sneaky weazel secret mission
In episode 8, Nathan and Poh received a secret mission in which they had to sneak out of camp to the Tok Tokkie after all their campmates had gone to sleep. In the Tok Tokkie, they were given ingredients to make a bowl of popcorn in the camp's treehouse, which they had to do without raising the suspicions of their campmates. If their campmates weren't alerted to Nathan and Poh making their popcorn they would be allowed to eat it, however if someone raised their suspicions, they couldn't eat any popcorn.

Beau's Super Spicy Secret Mission
In episode 9, Beau was given the opportunity to win his campmates McSpicy Meals, through participating in a two part challenge. In the first round, he had to drop the word "spicy" in three different scenarios. In between the rounds, he was given a chocolate shake to drink. In the second round, he had to make three of his campmates say the word "spicy". Beau succeeded in his challenge and won the camp McSpicy Meals for lunch.

Nathan's secret mission
In episode 14, Nathan was given the opportunity to win his campmates breakfast smoothies by pretending he had heartburn and making up an alternative breathing technique which he had to repeat on three instances in front of his campmates. Nathan made up the "headstand" method, in which he took slow, deep breaths whilst in the headstand position, and as his campmates were unsuspicious he succeeded in his mission and won the camp smoothies for breakfast.

Brooke's secret mission: Farts
In episode 15, Brooke was given a three round fart-based mission. In the first round, she was given a small sound device which played pre-recorded farts when she pressed a remote. She was told that she had to fart on three instances in front of three of her campmates. In the second round, Brooke gained an accomplice in the mission, David, who was given control of her remote, while Brooke had a similar mission to her first round although didn't have control of when she farted. In the third round, Brooke was given fart spray which she had to spray in the camp want raising the suspicions of her campmates. As Brooke succeeded in her mission, she won the camp english muffins with baked beans for breakfast.

The Camp's secret mission: "nose"
All the celebrities in the camp, other than David, were given fake noses and had to wear them while dropping the word "nose" in a conversation. As David was unsuspicious, the campmates each won a nose-shaped chocolate.

Ratings

Ratings data is from OzTAM and represents the live and same day average viewership from the 5 largest Australian metropolitan centres (Sydney, Melbourne, Brisbane, Adelaide and Perth).

References

08
2022 Australian television seasons
Television series impacted by the COVID-19 pandemic